Ozaukee may refer to:

 Ozaukee County, Wisconsin, in the United States
 The Ozaukee Ice Center, a two-sheet ice arena located in Mequon, Wisconsin, in the United States
 The Ozaukee Interurban Trail, or Ozaukee-Sheboygan Interurban Trail, a rail trail in Ozaukee, Sheboygan, and Milwaukee counties, in Wisconsin in the United States
 , a United States Navy cargo ship in commission from 1918 to 1919